Edward Walter Olczyk Jr. (born August 16, 1966) is an American former center in the National Hockey League for 16 seasons with the Chicago Blackhawks, Toronto Maple Leafs, Winnipeg Jets, New York Rangers, Los Angeles Kings, and Pittsburgh Penguins. He won the Stanley Cup with the Rangers in 1994. Olczyk was also the head coach of the Pittsburgh Penguins from June 2003 to December 2005.

He served as a television color commentator for NHL on NBC until its end in 2021 and currently commentates on TNT and Seattle Kraken games on Root Sports Northwest. He also currently serves as the Horse Racing Handicapper and Analyst for NBC's Horse Racing Coverage. Throughout his career as an NHL player, he played 1,031 NHL games and produced 342 goals and 452 assists for a total of 794 points. He was inducted into the United States Hockey Hall of Fame on February 22, 2013.

Olczyk was tied with Phil Kessel for the second-longest point streak by an American-born player in NHL history, at 18 games, having set the original mark in 1989–90, while with Toronto. The record was broken by Patrick Kane of the Chicago Blackhawks during the  season.

Playing career

Amateur career 
As a youth, Olczyk played in the 1978 and 1979 Quebec International Pee-Wee Hockey Tournaments with a minor ice hockey team from Chicago.

Olczyk grew up in Niles, Illinois and Palos Heights, Illinois and went to Brother Rice Catholic High School. He was a star on the Illinois midget AAA team (Team Illinois) that won the 1982 national title against a Detroit Compuware squad that featured future NHL stars Pat LaFontaine and Al Iafrate. He then moved to Canada to play for the Stratford Cullitons junior team before joining the 1984 U.S. Olympic hockey team.

Professional career 
Olczyk was selected by the Chicago Blackhawks as the third overall pick in the first round of the 1984 NHL Entry Draft. He scored his first NHL goal in his first NHL game on October 11, 1984, versus the Detroit Red Wings in Chicago Stadium against Greg Stefan. From 1984 through 1987, Olczyk was a member of Chicago's infamous "Clydesdale Line" with Troy Murray and Curt Fraser, the nickname coined by Chicago's broadcaster Pat Foley, as each player weighed in at or around 200 pounds. He was traded several times during his career. In 1987, Olczyk was traded to the Toronto Maple Leafs with Al Secord for Rick Vaive, Steve Thomas, and Bob McGill. 

In the 1989-90 season, Olczyk recorded an 18 game point streak, setting the record for longest point streak by an American player. Later tied by Phil Kessel, the record would stand until being passed by Patrick Kane in 2015-16 season. The 18 game streak would remain a Toronto franchise record (tied with Darryl Sittler until being surpassed in December 2022 by Mitch Marner.

He was traded again in 1990 to the Winnipeg Jets, with Mark Osborne for Dave Ellett and Paul Fenton.

In 1992, he was traded for the third time in his career, this time to the New York Rangers for Kris King and Tie Domi. Olczyk missed much of the 1993–94 season recovering from a thumb injury suffered in a game versus the Florida Panthers on January 3, 1994; he took part in one playoff game (conference final game 6) and on June 14, 1994, became Stanley Cup champion with the Rangers.

During the next season, he was traded back to the Winnipeg Jets for their fifth-round choice (who ended up being Alexei Vasiliev) in the 1995 NHL Entry Draft. After signing as a free agent with the Los Angeles Kings in 1996, he would not finish the season with them before being traded to the Pittsburgh Penguins for Glen Murray. He finished his career in Chicago.

Post-playing career 
He returned to Pittsburgh to become the color commentator for the Penguins on FSN Pittsburgh, where he was given the nickname "Edzo" by current radio announcer and then co-announcer Mike Lange. In 2003, he moved from the booth to the bench and served as head coach of the Pittsburgh Penguins from June 11, 2003, until December 15, 2005. Despite adding marquee free-agents, the Penguins started the season with a disappointing 8–17–6 record, leading to Olczyk's dismissal on December 15.

Beginning with the 2006–07 NHL season, Olczyk was the color commentator for the Chicago Blackhawks television broadcasts, partnering play-by-play announcer Pat Foley. He also was the lead color commentator for NHL on NBC, and previously for the NHL on Versus; the latter later rebranded as NBCSN in 2012. Olczyk was also the lead color commentator for the 2010 Vancouver Winter Olympics Men's Ice Hockey, where he partnered with Mike Emrick and "Inside-the-Glass" reporter Pierre McGuire.

At the end of the 5–3 U.S. win over Canada at the 2010 Vancouver Winter Olympics, Olczyk described the game as being "tremendously tremendous" after U.S. forward Ryan Kesler scored an empty-netter. The audio of Olczyk saying "This has been tremendously tremendous" was an instant hit among hockey enthusiasts and was the subject of many spoofs online. He was selected to repeat his duties alongside Emrick for the 2014 Sochi Winter Olympics.

In February 2016, it was announced that Olczyk would be the recipient of the Ring Lardner Award, which was founded in 2002 by the Chicago Athletic Association and honors broadcasters and writers who "exemplify the wit and warmth of Ring Lardner's writing." On July 11, 2012, Olczyk became the 16th Blackhawks player elected into the United States Hockey Hall of Fame. The Blackhawks honored "Edzo" for his induction in a pregame ceremony on February 22, 2013, at the United Center.

In 2009, Olczyk received an Emmy for "Outstanding Achievement for Individual Excellence On Camera: Programming," followed by a 2012 Emmy for "Outstanding Achievement for Sports Programs - Sporting Event/Game - Live/Unedited Program/Special." He was also inducted into the National Italian American Sports Hall of Fame in 2013.

On April 8, 2010, Olczyk returned to Pittsburgh to join more than 50 former Pittsburgh Penguins players being honored in a pregame ceremony before the final regular season game at Civic Arena in Pittsburgh.

On December 30, 2010, it was announced that Foley and Olczyk signed a three-year extension to stay with the Blackhawks.

On May 5, 2014, EA Sports announced that "Eddie O" will provide color commentary for NHL 15 alongside play-by-play announcer Mike Emrick and "Inside-the-Glass" reporter Ray Ferraro. The trio have provided commentary for every EA Sports NHL game until NHL 19, when Ferraro became the new color commentator. Since the 2018–19 NHL season, "Inside-the-Glass" reporter Brian Boucher joins Emrick, Olczyk, and McGuire for big games. After Emrick retired on October 19, 2020, at the end of the 2020 Stanley Cup Finals, he was paired with Kenny Albert and John Forslund for most of the regular season but was paired with Albert for the playoffs and the Stanley Cup Finals. 

Albert and Olczyk joined TNT after the Finals as their lead broadcast team (erstwhile NBC studio analyst Keith Jones was later added to join the pair).

Olczyk also has an interest in Thoroughbred horse racing, appearing in advertisements for Xpressbet and serving as a guest commentator and handicapper for major horse racing events such as the Kentucky Derby, Kentucky Oaks, Preakness Stakes, and the Belmont Stakes on NBC networks, and on WGN Sports coverage of the Arlington Million that is fed nationally. Despite his arrival at Turner for hockey, Olczyk’s deal will allow him to remain at NBC to cover handicap horse racing.

On July 18, 2022, Olczyk left the Blackhawks following a contract dispute to join the broadcasting team for the Seattle Kraken.

Personal life 
Olczyk and his wife, Diana, have three sons, all former hockey players, and one daughter. Nick played for the Colorado College Tigers and, in 2022, became a television studio analyst for the Seattle Kraken. Tom, who played hockey at Penn State, most recently played professionally for the Indy Fuel of the ECHL and the Rockford IceHogs of the AHL. Eddie III spent a season with the Bloomington Thunder of the SPHL, has been an assistant coach with the Bemidji State Beavers, and is an amateur scout for the Kraken. Olczyk's daughter Zandra attended the University of Alabama.

Rick Olczyk, Eddie's younger brother, is a former hockey player for Brown University and became an assistant general manager for the Kraken in 2019.

On August 8, 2017, Olczyk issued a statement through the Blackhawks to announce that he had been diagnosed with a form of colon cancer. He underwent a surgical procedure to remove the tumor. In March 2018, Olczyk announced that he was officially "cancer-free."

In October 2019, Olczyk released his autobiography, Eddie Olczyk: Beating the Odds in Hockey and in Life, in which he shares details of his fight with stage 3 colon cancer.

Career statistics

Regular season and playoffs

International

Awards and achievements 
 Stanley Cup champion – 1994 (New York Rangers)
 United States Hockey Hall of Fame 2012
 National Polish-American Sports Hall of Fame 2004

National team 
 1984 Winter Olympics (seventh place)
 1984 Canada Cup (fourth place)
 1987 Canada Cup (fifth place)
 1991 Canada Cup (second place)
 Ice Hockey World Championships: 1985 (fourth place), 1986 (sixth place), 1987 (seventh place), 1989 (sixth place), 1993 (sixth place)

Coaching record

See also 
 List of NHL players with 1,000 games played

References

External links 
 
 Ed Olczyk's profile at hockeydraftcentral.com

1966 births
Living people
American men's ice hockey centers
American ice hockey coaches
American people of Polish descent
Chicago Blackhawks announcers
Chicago Blackhawks draft picks
Chicago Blackhawks players
Chicago Wolves (IHL) players
Ice hockey coaches from Illinois
Ice hockey players from Illinois
Ice hockey players at the 1984 Winter Olympics
Los Angeles Kings players
National Hockey League broadcasters
National Hockey League first-round draft picks
New York Rangers players
Olympic ice hockey players of the United States
American horse racing commentators
People from Palos Heights, Illinois
Pittsburgh Penguins coaches
Pittsburgh Penguins players
Seattle Kraken announcers
Stanley Cup champions
Toronto Maple Leafs players
Winnipeg Jets (1979–1996) players